is a Paralympian athlete from Japan competing mainly in category T11 long-distance events.

Yuichi took part in the 5000m, 10000m and marathon in the 2004 Summer Paralympics winning the T11 marathon.  In the 2008 Summer Paralympics he attempted to defend this title but only managed to finish 16th.

References

Paralympic athletes of Japan
Athletes (track and field) at the 2004 Summer Paralympics
Athletes (track and field) at the 2008 Summer Paralympics
Paralympic gold medalists for Japan
Living people
Medalists at the 2004 Summer Paralympics
Year of birth missing (living people)
Paralympic medalists in athletics (track and field)
Japanese male long-distance runners
Japanese male marathon runners